Bocchetto Sessera or Bocchetto di Sessera is a  mountain pass (el. 1,373 m) across the Alpi Biellesi. It connects Strona di Mosso Valley and Valsessera, both in the  province of Biella (Piemonte, Italy) .

Etymology 

In the local dialect bochet means mountain pass, while Sessera is the name of the river which flows in the Sessera Valley.

Geography 
The pass is located between Monticchio (1,697 m, W) and monte Marca (1,558 m, E).
It belongs to the water divide between the drainage basins of Cervo and Sessera.

Access 
Bocchetto di Sassera can be accessed by car from Campiglia Cervo or from Trivero by the former national road Strada statale 232 Panoramica Zegna. From the pass start some forestry roads which deserve the middle section of Sessera Valley. Some of these dirt roads by winter are used as cross-country skiing paths.

Maps
 Italian official cartography (Istituto Geografico Militare - IGM); on-line version: www.pcn.minambiente.it
 Provincia di Biella cartography: Carta dei sentieri della Provincia di Biella, 1:25.00 scale, 2004; on line version:  webgis.provincia.biella.it

References 

Biellese Alps
Mountain passes of Piedmont
Mountain passes of the Alps